For My Crimes is the eighth studio album by American musician Marissa Nadler. It was released on September 28, 2018 under Bella Union in the UK, and Sacred Bones Records in the US.

Production
The album was produced with Justin Raisen and Lawrence Rothman at the House of Lux Studio in Laurel Canyon, Los Angeles, and features collaborations by Angel Olsen, Sharon Van Etten and Kristin Kontrol.

Release
On June 27, 2018, Nadler announced the release of her eighth studio album, along with the title track which features a collaboration by Angel Olsen.

The second single "Blue Vapor" was released on August 8, 2018. "Blue Vapor" was voted Best Song of the Year by Tiny Mix Tapes.

On September 10, 2018, the third single "I Can't Listen to Gene Clark Anymore" was released, which features a collaboration by American actress and musician Sharon van Etten.

Critical reception
For My Crimes was met with "generally favorable" reviews from critics. At Metacritic, which assigns a weighted average rating out of 100 to reviews from mainstream publications, this release received an average score of 77, based on 17 reviews. Aggregator Album of the Year gave the release a 75 out of 100 based on a critical consensus of 19 reviews.

Charles Cook from The 405 said of the album: "Even though themes of distance and time are key players in the message Nadler is trying to convey, the personal heart of the album is often swamped by her trademark ethereal production and sometimes abstract lyricism. The imagery feels both impersonal and melodramatic, without offering any reason for empathy." Liz Ikowsky from Albumism said: "Written in response to the emotional strain of being a touring musician, For My Crimes feels therapeutic and apologetic. The mythic quality of her voice transports the listener, fully enveloping you in Nadler's world." She also noted the songs on the album "reflect a person being confronted with the truth and grieving the mistakes made along the way." Nick Roseblade from Clash noted on the album that "each song plays like an exquisite short story. Through the intricate word play we are given just enough information to know what's going on, but not enough to get the full story." David Sackllah from Consequence of Sound said the album "is a shining example of how Nadler continues to impress and improve upon each release. By putting the focus on her expressive characterization, she moves beyond the forlorn goth label that always seemed to accompany her work."

Accolades

Track listing

Charts

Personnel

Musicians
 Marissa Nadler – primary artist , producer 
 Dana Colley – sax 
 Eva Gardner – bass 
 Mary Lattimore – harp 
 Patty Schemel – drums 
 Janel Leppin – cello , mellotron 
 Angel Olsen – backing vocals 
 Sharon Van Etten – backing vocals 
 Kristin Kontrol – vocals 

Production
 Jesse Newport – engineer 
 Justin Raisen – producer 
 Lawrence Rothman – engineer , producer 
 Heba Kadry – mastering
 Christen Dute – design

Release history

References

External links
 

2018 albums
Marissa Nadler albums
Bella Union albums
Sacred Bones Records albums
Albums produced by Justin Raisen